Udea zernyi is a species of moth in the family Crambidae. It was first described by Klima in 1939 and it is found in Spain.

Taxonomy
Pionea zernyi is the replacement name for Pionea melanostictalis (Zerny, 1927) which is preoccupied by Udea melanostictalis, described by George Hampson in 1916.

References

zernyi
Moths of Europe
Moths described in 1939